The 1985 Moscow Victory Day Parade was held on 9 May 1985 on the Red Square in Moscow to commemorate the 40th anniversary of the Victory in Europe. The parade marked the Soviet Union's victory in the Great Patriotic War. It was the first V-Day parade held since 1965, and the third of four Victory Day parades held during the Soviet Union's existence.

Prior to 1965 Victory Day was not a major holiday and parades were not held, with the exception of the 1945 Victory Day Parade. The Victory Parade of 1985 was the third made after 1945 Victory Day Parade. After this parade next would be held 1990.

The parade was observed by Soviet leaders from the Lenin Mausoleum. Major political figures attending were General Secretary Mikhail Gorbachev, and Minister of Defense Marshal Sergei Sokolov among others. The parade was commanded by the Moscow Military District Commander General of the Army Pyotr Lushev, and was his last major national parade in this capacity. During this parade veterans marched in Red Square for the first time, the next time being in 1990.

Full order of the marchpast 
Following the limousine carrying General of the Army Lushev, the parade marched past Red Square in the following order:

Military bands 
 Massed Military Bands of the Moscow Military District

Ground column 

 Corps of Drums of the Moscow Military Music College
 Victory Banner Color Guard
 Front Standards
 Colour guard battalion of regimental, brigade and division colors of the Soviet Army
 Veterans regiment
 Heroes of the Soviet Union
 Recipients of the Order of Glory
 Veteran participants of the Moscow Victory Parade of 1945
 Veterans of the Polish People's Army (Polish 1st Infantry Division)
 Veterans of the Czechoslovak People's Army (Czechoslovak 1st Corps)
 Partisans
 Civil awardees of the Order of Labour Glory
 Historical regiment
 M. V. Frunze Military Academy
 V. I. Lenin Military Political Academy
 Military Artillery Academy "Felix Dzerzhinsky"
 Military Armored Forces Academy Marshal Rodion Malinovsky 
 Military Engineering Academy
 Military Academy of Chemical Defense and Control
 Yuri Gagarin Air Force Academy
 Prof. Nikolai Zhukovsky Air Force Engineering Academy
 M. V. Frunze Naval College
 98th Airborne Division
 Moscow Border Guards Institute of the Border Defence Forces of the KGB "Moscow City Council"
 366th Guards Marine Brigade of the Baltic Fleet
 OMSDON Ind. Motorized Division of the Internal Troops of the Ministry of Internal Affairs of the USSR "Felix Dzerzhinsky"
 Suvorov Military School
 Nakhimov Naval School
 Moscow Military High Command Training School "Supreme Soviet of the Russian SFSR"

Mobile Column 
 Historical segment
 GAZ-67B
 T-34
 SU-100
 SU-76
 53-K
 ML-20
 M-30
 B-4
 A-19
 Katyusha rocket launchers (BM-13Ns)
 61-K
 52-K
 2nd Guards Tamanskaya Motorized Rifle Division
 BRDM-2
 BTR-70
 BMP-2
 98th Airborne Division
 BMD-1
 4th Guards Kantermirovsky Tank Division
 T-72
 T-80
 Rocket Forces and Field Artillery
 BM-21 Grad
 2S1 Gvozdika
 2S3 Akatsiya
 2K12 Kub
 9K52 Luna-M
 SS-1 Scud

Music 
Providing the ceremonial music for the parade was the massed bands of the Moscow Military District, under the overall direction of Major General Nikolay Mikhailov.

Inspection and address
 Jubilee Slow March "25 Years of the Red Army" (Юбилейный встречный марш "25 лет РККА) by Semeon Tchenertsky
 Slow March of the Tankmen (Встречный Марш Танкистов) by Semeon Tchenertsky
 Slow March of the Guards of the Navy (Гвардейский Встречный Марш Военно-Морского Флота) by Nikolai Pavlocich Ivanov-Radkevich
 Slow March of the Officers Schools (Встречный Марш офицерских училищ) by Semyon Tchernetsky)
 Slow March Victory (Встречный Марш «Победа») by Yuriy Griboyedov
 Slow March of the Officers Schools (Встречный Марш офицерских училищ) by Semyon Tchernetsky)
 Slow March (Встречный Марш) by Dmitry Pertsev
 Slow March of the Red Army (Встречный Марш Красной Армии) by Semyon Tchernetsky
 Slow March (Встречный Марш) by Severian Ganichev
 Slow March Victory (Встречный Марш «Победа») by Yuriy Griboyedov
 Slow March of the Guards of the Navy (Гвардейский Встречный Марш Военно-Морского Флота) by Nikolai Pavlocich Ivanov-Radkevich
 Slow March (Встречный Марш) by Viktor Sergeyebich Runov
 Glory (Славься) by Mikhail Glinka
 Signal Everyone, listen! (Сигнал «Слушайте все!») by unknown composer
 State Anthem of the Soviet Union (Государственный Гимн Советского Союза) by Alexander Alexandrov
 Fanfare (Фанфара)

Infantry Column
 Long Live our State (Да здравствует наша держава) by Boris Alexandrov
 "The Sacred War" (Священная война) by Alexandr Alexandrov
 Farewell of Slavianka (Прощание Славянки) by Vasiliy Agapkin
 Victory Day (День Победы) by David Fyodorovich Tukhmanov
 In Defense of the Homeland (В защиту Родины) by Viktor Sergeyevich Runov
 On Guard for the Peace (На страже Мира) by Boris Alexandrovich Diev
 Combat March (Строевой Марш) by Dmitry Illarionovich Pertsev
 Air March (Авиамарш) by Yuliy Abramovich Khait
 Leningrad (Ленинград) by Viktor Sergeyeich Runov
 We are the Army of the People (Мы Армия Народа) by Georgy Viktorovich Mavsesyan
 Sports March (Спортивный Марш) by Valentin Volkov
 Victory Day (День Победы) by David Fyodorovich Tukhmanov
 Long Live our State (Да здравствует наша держава) by Boris Alexandrov

 Mobile Column
 Victorious March (Победный Марш) by Nikolai Pavlocich Ivanov-Radkevich
 Salute to Moscow (Салют Москвы) by Semyon Tchernetsky
 Defenders of Moscow (Защитников Москвы) by Boris Alexandrovich Mokroysov
 Farewell of Slavianka (Прощание Славянки) by Vasiliy Agapkin
 Unknown march
 March of the Guards Mortar Personnel (Марш Гвардейцев-миномётчиков) by Semyon Tchernetsky
 March of the Tankmen (Марш Танкистов) by Semyon Tchernetsky

 Conclusion
 Invincible and legendary (Несокрушимая и легендарная) by Alexander Alexandrov
 Victory Day (День Победы) by David Fyodorovich Tukhmanov
 Invincible and legendary (Несокрушимая и легендарная) by Alexander Alexandrov

References

External links 
 Soviet Central Television footage of the parade

Moscow Victory Day Parades
1985 in Moscow
1985 in military history
May 1985 events in Europe